Dyakonovsky 2-y is a rural locality (a khutor) and the administrative center of Dyakonovskoye Rural Settlement, Uryupinsky District, Volgograd Oblast, Russia. The population was 904 as of 2010. There are 10 streets.

Geography 
Dyakonovsky 2-y is located in steppe, 8 km southeast of Uryupinsk (the district's administrative centre) by road. Kamenka is the nearest rural locality.

References 

Rural localities in Uryupinsky District